Nauru participated at the 2018 Summer Youth Olympics in Buenos Aires, Argentina from 6 October to 18 October 2018.

Competitors

Athletics

Track & road events

Boxing

Boys

Weightlifting

Nauru was given a quota by the tripartite committee to compete in weightlifting. They also qualified two at the Oceania championships 2018. 

Boy

Girl

Wrestling

Key:
  – Without any points scored by the opponent

References

2018 in Nauruan sport
Nations at the 2018 Summer Youth Olympics
Nauru at the Youth Olympics